Ulacalı (also, Uladzhaly, Uladzhrly, and Uludzhaly) is a village and municipality in the Sabirabad Rayon of Azerbaijan.  It has a population of 3,552.

References 

Populated places in Sabirabad District